Jeremy Antoine Reaves (born August 29, 1996) is an American football free safety and special teamer for the Washington Commanders of the National Football League (NFL). He played college football at South Alabama, where he was named the 2017 Sun Belt Defensive Player of the Year before having a brief stint with the NFL's Philadelphia Eagles prior to joining Washington later that year. In 2022, Reaves received Pro Bowl and first-team All-Pro honors for his special teams play after spending the majority of his career on the practice squad.

Early life and high school
Reaves was born and raised in Pensacola, Florida and attended Pensacola Catholic High School, where he played both baseball and football. He originally played running back for the Crusaders before his coach moved him to defensive back after his sophomore year. He was named first-team all-area as a junior and honorable mention All-State as a senior after recording 39 tackles and five interceptions despite missing an extended period of time because of vertebrae fractures.

College career
Reaves played four seasons for the South Alabama Jaguars, playing cornerback his first three years before moving to safety going into his senior season. He was named second-team All-Sun Belt as a sophomore, his first season as a starter, after making 96 tackles (2nd highest on the team), eight for a loss, and leading the team with six passes broken up and tying for the team lead with two interceptions and three forced fumbles. In his junior season Reaves was named first-team All-Sunbelt after making 85 tackles (5.5 for loss) and again led the team with seven pass breakups and was second on the team with three interceptions. As a senior, Reaves recorded 104 tackles, seven tackles for loss, three interceptions and three forced fumbles and was named Sun Belt Conference Defensive Player of the Year. Reaves finished his collegiate career with  301 tackles, eight interceptions, 22 passes defensed, and eight forced fumbles. His performance earned him an invitation to the 2018 Senior Bowl, where he made eight tackles and an interception.

Professional career

Philadelphia Eagles
Reaves signed with the Philadelphia Eagles as an undrafted free agent on April 28, 2018. He was waived by the Eagles on September 1, 2018.

Washington Redskins / Football Team / Commanders

Reaves was signed to the Washington Redskins practice squad on September 12, 2018. He was promoted to the Redskins' active roster on December 19, 2018. He made his NFL debut on December 22, 2018 against the Tennessee Titans.

Reaves was waived on August 31, 2019, but was signed to the practice squad the following day. He was promoted to the active roster on October 12, 2019. Reaves made his first career start on October 24, 2019 against the Minnesota Vikings, making three tackles before leaving the game due to a concussion. In 2019, Reaves finished the season with 15 tackles, a quarterback hit and a pass defended in nine games played (three starts).

On September 5, 2020, Reaves was waived and signed to their practice squad the following day. He was promoted back to the active roster following a season ending injury to Landon Collins on October 27. In Week 12 against the Dallas Cowboys on Thanksgiving, Reaves recorded his first career sack on Andy Dalton during the 41–16 win.
In Week 17 against the his former team, the Philadelphia Eagles on Sunday Night Football, Reaves recorded his first career interception off a pass thrown by Nate Sudfeld during the 20–14 win.

Reaves was released on August 31, 2021, but re-signed to the practice squad the following day. On December 11, he was activated to the active roster as a COVID-19 replacement player. The team signed him to the active roster on January 8, 2022.

Reaves made the Commanders' 53-man roster out of training camp in 2022, the first time in his career that he had done so after being a final cut in each of his previous four NFL seasons. In December 2022, Reaves was voted in his first Pro Bowl as the special teams starter of the 2023 Pro Bowl. In January 2023, Reeves was named first-team All-Pro.

On March 15, 2023, the Commanders placed a tender on Reaves that will allow them match any other team's contract offer as they continue negotiations on a new contract.

References

External links
 Washington Commanders bio
 South Alabama Jaguars bio

1996 births
Living people
Players of American football from Pensacola, Florida
American football safeties
South Alabama Jaguars football players
Philadelphia Eagles players
Washington Commanders players
Washington Football Team players
Washington Redskins players
National Conference Pro Bowl players